Siyabonga Nkosi (born 22 August 1981) is a South African former footballer who played as an attacking midfielder.

International goals

Honours
 Telkom Knockout Cup: 2007
 Premier Soccer League: 2009–10
 Premier Soccer League: 2012–13
 Nedbank Cup: 2013
 Carling Black Label Cup: 2013

References

External links

1981 births
Living people
People from Newcastle, KwaZulu-Natal
Zulu people
South African soccer players
South Africa international soccer players
South African expatriate soccer players
Kaizer Chiefs F.C. players
Bloemfontein Celtic F.C. players
Arminia Bielefeld players
Maccabi Netanya F.C. players
Lamontville Golden Arrows F.C. players
Bundesliga players
Expatriate footballers in Israel
South African expatriate sportspeople in Israel
Expatriate footballers in Germany
South African expatriate sportspeople in Germany
Association football midfielders
Association football forwards
SuperSport United F.C. players
2005 CONCACAF Gold Cup players
2006 Africa Cup of Nations players
Soccer players from KwaZulu-Natal